is a Japanese former pitcher and current baseball analyst. Despite being one of the best pitchers of his generation, Egawa's perceived arrogance and non-conformist ways earned him the media nicknames "Dirty Egawa," "The Giant Devil," and "The Enemy of the People." This was because Egawa was single minded for the team he wanted to play for, which was the Yomiuri Giants.

High school career
Egawa entered Sakushin Gakuin High School. In his high school career, he recorded two perfect games, nine no-hitters, 20 shutouts, and 30 complete games in 44 games pitched. He closed out his high school career with an earned run average of 0.41, which was significantly lower than Daisuke Matsuzaka (1.12) and Masahiro Tanaka (1.31). In the spring of 1973, he set a still-standing record of 60 strikeouts in National High School Baseball Invitational Tournament. He was nicknamed "The Monster", a nickname that Matsuzaka later received as well. However, he was different from Matsuzaka in not having strong teammates. His team had never won the championship at the Koshien Stadium.

College career 
At Hosei University, Egawa was also a dominant pitcher, setting a number of school records.

Professional career
Egawa was drafted by the Crown Lighter Lions in 1977, but turned down the team's offer because he wanted only to play for the Yomiuri Giants. Instead, he played semi-pro ball, and 12 months later, he signed a contract with the Giants — despite the fact that the Hanshin Tigers had drafted him number one in the 1978 draft. On November 21, 1978, Egawa was traded to the Giants. Because there was no reverse-draft, this act was regarded as unfair by the other Japanese professional baseball teams, and they protested. Nonetheless, Egawa officially joined the Giants before the 1979 season. (The trade, however, brought Hanshin pitcher Shigeru Kobayashi, who won 22 games that season.) 

Egawa notched over 10 wins as a pitcher each year from 1980 until his retirement. In 1981, his record of 20–6, with a 2.28 earned run average and 221 strikeouts earned him the Japanese Triple Crown and the Central League MVP.

He recorded eight consecutive strikeouts in the 1984 All-Star game, just missing Yutaka Enatsu's record of nine straight strikeouts.

In 1985, American expatriate player Randy Bass of the Hanshin Tigers was poised to break Sadaharu Oh's single-season record of 55 home runs. The Yomiuri Giants pitchers — whose manager was Sadaharu Oh — were said to have been given instructions to intentionally walk Bass in every at-bat. However, Egawa ignored the indication in the first game of the two last Giants' games against Hanshin Tigers — Bass went 1 for 2 against Egawa, with a single and an unintentional walk. After Egawa left the mound, Bass was issued five walks in six at-bats.

On June 26, 1986, Egawa gave up a home run to Bass, which was Bass' seventh consecutive game with a home run. Sadaharu Oh's record is also seven consecutive games. Egawa was admired for his fair play, even though it sometimes went against the wishes of his team.

Egawa retired in 1987 at the still young age of 32, claiming arm issues. Like Hiromitsu Ochiai, known for his Oreryu (オレ流) attitude ("to do with only my style"), Egawa was considered part of a new generation of Japanese baseball players who rejected the traditional values of "obligation, self-sacrifice, and deference to their superiors."

Retirement
Since he retired in 1987, he has been working as a baseball analyst. In the Japanese anime film Whisper of the Heart, he played a role as a baseball analyst.

References

External links

1955 births
Living people
Baseball people from Tochigi Prefecture
Hosei University alumni
Japanese baseball players
Nippon Professional Baseball pitchers
Yomiuri Giants players
Nippon Professional Baseball MVP Award winners